The Louis Schwitzer Award (also called the Louis H. Schwitzer Award for Engineering Innovation and Excellence) is presented by the Indiana Section of SAE International to an engineer or team of engineers "for their innovative design and engineering excellence" and acknowledges "engineers with the courage and conviction to explore and develop new concepts in racing technology" in racing vehicles for the Indianapolis 500. The accolade also distinguishes engineers who were most responsible for designing and developing the winning concept to comply to IndyCar Series technical regulations, and awards "functional and recent permutations" that improve energy efficiency, performance or safety in chassis, drive train profiles by "emphasizing competitive potential along with future automotive industry possibilities." Although the award specifically recognizes new concepts, experimental ideas arising from previous winners are considered if the development in engineering improves it.

It was established at the 1967 event and renamed after automotive engineer, inventor and former chairman of SAE International's Indiana Section Louis H. Schwitzer by SAE before the 1978 race. Schwitzer also won the first automobile race to be held at Indianapolis Motor Speedway in 1909. Each year before the Indianapolis 500, an Indiana Section SAE International members committee meet with IndyCar Series technical officials to identify potential candidates. The committee interviews candidates and votes to determine the winner. Accolade sponsor BorgWarner and the Indiana Section of SAE International provide $10,000 prize money to the recipient or team, who receive a plaque and have their names added to a permanent trophy on display at the Indianapolis Motor Speedway Museum. The presentation of the award is made annually at Indianapolis Motor Speedway before the Indianapolis 500.

During the 54 years the award has been presented, there have been a total of 103 recipients. The inaugural winner was Andy Granatelli, who developed the gas-turbine run STP-Paxton Turbocar for the 1967 event. The award has been presented for two concepts in a single year just once: in 1977, to Bob Bubenik and Bruce Crower for developing the automatic clutch and flat-eight engine, respectively. Two years later, John Barnard and Jim Hall were the first team to be recognized for designing the Chaparral 2K chassis for that year's Indianapolis 500. Since then, another 24 teams have been recognized. Firestone tire engineer Cara Adams became the first female recipient in the 2019 edition. The award has been presented posthumously once, to Don Burgoon in the 2017 race. The 2020 winners were Tino Belli, Marco Bertolini, Ed Collings, Craig McCarthy, Antonio Montanari, Bill Pappas, Stefan Seidel and Brent Wright, who developed the IndyCar Aeroscreen cockpit protection device. The four most recent honorees were engineers Luca De Angelis, Luca Pierrettori, Taylor Prohaska and Simone Pusca in the 2022 event; they were recognized for their work on the EM Marshalling System.

Recipients

Statistics

See also
 List of motor vehicle awards
 PACE Award

Notes

References

External links
 Louis Schwitzer Award winners from Indianapolis Motor Speedway

Indianapolis 500
Motor vehicle awards
BorgWarner